The Hamilton-class cutter was the largest class of vessel in the United States Coast Guard until replaced by the Legend-class cutter, aside from the .  The hull classification symbol is prefixed WHEC. The cutters are called the Hamilton class after their lead ship, or the "Secretary class" because most of the vessels in the class were named for former Secretaries of the Treasury (with the exception of the "Hero-class cutters" Jarvis, Munro and Midgett).

Design
The Hamilton-class cutters were designed to be a highly versatile platform capable of performing various operations, including maritime law enforcement, search and rescue, oceanographic research, and defense operations. Because of their endurance and capabilities, the Hamilton-class cutters commonly deployed with Carrier Battle Groups. They were built with a welded steel hull and aluminum superstructure. The Hamilton-class cutters' hull was designed with a V cross section, and through tank testing the hull was expected to survive and stay afloat longer after suffering damage. They are powered by a Combined Diesel or Gas (CODOG) system consisting of two diesel engines and two gas turbines, and have controllable-pitch propellers, they were the first U.S. military vessels with combination diesel or gas turbine operation. Equipped with a helicopter flight deck, retractable hangar, and the facilities to support helicopter deployment.

Combat Suite
The Hamilton-class cutters were designed and built during the Cold War, due to this they were originally equipped for anti-submarine warfare (ASW), with the capability to find, track and destroy enemy submarines. When constructed, they were armed with a 5"/38 naval gun, two 81 mm mortars, two .50 caliber machine guns, two MK 10 Hedgehogs, two MK 32 torpedo tube systems, and Nixie torpedo countermeasures. 

During the 1980s and 1990s the cutters were modernized under the Fleet Rehabilitation and Modernization (FRAM) program. The FRAM program replaced the 5"/38 gun with the MK 75 76 mm naval gun, upgraded the MK 32 Surface Vessel Torpedo Tubes to Mod 7, installed MK 36 SRBOC launchers and the AN/SLQ-32 electronic warfare suite, and upgraded the cutters' sonar and their air and surface search radars. During the modernization of the cutters the U.S. Navy saw the program as a low cost and easy way to use the cutters as a valuable force multiplier with trained crews that could be called upon during war. After the completion of FRAM, a joint Navy/USCG board decided further upgrades to the cutters' armament would be implemented, including the installation of Harpoon anti-ship missiles and a MK 15 Phalanx CIWS. The Harpoon anti-ship missiles were fitted to multiple cutters of the class but only one cutter, the USCGC Mellon, ever fired a Harpoon missile (in January 1990). After the collapse of the Soviet Union, the joint Navy/USCG board decided there was no military threat to require the installation of anti-ship missiles and anti-submarine weapons on board cutters, and subsequently removed the weapons. 

After the removal of the ASW weapons, the Coast Guard installed MK 38 25 mm chain guns on both sides of each cutter. Currently the Hamilton-class cutters are equipped with the Coast Guard's SeaWatch command and control system, which combines navigational, tactical, surveillance and communications into one situational awareness picture, replacing the cutters' outdated Shipboard Command and Control System. Missile defense is handled by the MK 36 launchers and the Phalanx CIWS.

History
The 378-foot WHEC cutter program which created the Hamilton class was initiated in the 1960s. The Hamilton-class cutters were intended to fulfill both the peacetime and wartime requirements of the Coast Guard. Construction at Avondale Shipyards on the lead ship, the Hamilton, began in the 1960s and the cutter was commissioned on March 18, 1967. Originally the Coast Guard planned to build 36 Hamilton-class cutters, but due to the termination of the ocean stations program they reduced the number of planned cutters to 12. 

During the Vietnam War multiple Hamilton-class cutters supported Operation Market Time. The cutters patrolled the South Vietnamese coastline, boarded and inspected suspected North Vietnamese and Viet Cong vessels, conducted naval gunfire support missions, and provided medical assistance to Vietnamese civilians. Throughout their service cutters would also participate in other conflicts and military operations such as Operation Urgent Fury, Operation Vigilant Sentinel, Operation Deny Flight, and Operation Iraqi Freedom. 

Beginning in the 1980s and ending in 1992, the entire class was modernized through the FRAM program. The program included updates and changes to the cutters weapons, sensors, addition of a helicopter hangar, engine overhauls, and improved habitability.

Cutters Midgett and Munro were renamed to John Midgett and Douglas Munro to allow the new Legend-class cutters Midgett and Munro to assume the former names of the two Hamilton-class cutters.

In March 2007, cutters Hamilton and Sherman intercepted the Panamanian-flagged fishing vessel Gatun in international waters and were able to recover  of cocaine, with an estimated street value of $600 million retail. The seizure was at that time the largest at-sea drug bust in US history.

Ships in class

Operators

 Vietnam Coast Guard

Potential

Former

See also

References

External links

 High Endurance Cutter Fact Sheet
GlobalSecurity.org overview
Next Navy ship to be named after Corregidor hero

High endurance cutters
 
Corvette classes